Georges Cuvelier (born 26 May 1895, date of death unknown) was a French racing cyclist. He rode in the 1923 Tour de France.

References

1895 births
1974 deaths
French male cyclists